Shwayze is the debut album of American rapper Aaron Smith, better known as Shwayze, released through Suretone Records on August 19, 2008. While Smith wrote the lyrics for the songs, Cisco Adler is credited for production, as well as cowriting the entire album. The first single off the album is "Buzzin'", followed by "Corona and Lime". The album has only one feature, coming from guitarist Dave Navarro, at the end of the song "Flashlight". There is also a hidden track, that is #69 on the CD, entitled "High Together". Smith and Adler released a mixtape shortly after this album, entitled "Rich Girls" that is available as a free download. The album debuted at #10 on the Billboard 200 with 47,000 copies sold in the first week.

Track listing

 
Samples
 "Don't Be Shy" samples "Do Wah Diddy Diddy" written by Jeff Barry and Ellie Greenwich, originally performed by The Exciters
 "Hollywood" samples "Charlie Brown" written by Jerry Leiber and Mike Stoller, originally performed by The Coasters
 "Lost My Mind" contains a line from Boyz-n-the-Hood  by Eazy-E.

Personnel

Shwayze
Cisco Adler - lead vocals, Guitar
Aaron Smith - lead vocals
Trevor McFedries - DJ/Producer

Additional musicians
B. Russ - Bass
Danny Chaimson - Piano
Dave Navarro - Electric Guitar
Jeramy Gritter - Acoustic Guitar

Chart positions

References

External links
 

2008 debut albums
Shwayze albums